The Plebs' League was a British educational and political organisation which originated around a Marxist way of thinking in 1908 and was active until 1926.

History
Central to the formation of the League was Noah Ablett, a miner from the Rhondda who was at the core of a group at Ruskin College, Oxford who challenged the lecturers' opposition to Marxism.  In the 1907–8 academic year, Ablett began leading unofficial classes in Marxist political economy which were attended by Ebby Edwards, among others.  Ablett returned to South Wales in 1908, where he began promoting Marxist education through local branches of the Independent Labour Party.

A mixture of students and former students at Ruskin founded the Plebs' League in November 1908, also launching the Plebs' Magazine.  In the first issue of the Plebs, dated February 1909, Ablett contributed an article on the need for Independent Working Class Education.  The League ran classes teaching Marxist principles and later syndicalist ideas.

During 1909, student agitation for Marxism continued at Ruskin.  The students were supported by the Principal, Dennis Hird, and when he was dismissed the students went on strike, refusing to attend classes.  The rebels formed the Central Labour College, which worked closely with the Plebs' League.

By 1910, the Plebs' League was active in South Wales, Lancashire and Scotland.  Activists included A. J. Cook, William Mainwaring, Mark Starr and John Maclean.

The League had sympathies with De Leonism, primarily represented in Britain by the Socialist Labour Party.  It later had a relationship with the Communist Party of Great Britain.

The League was absorbed by the National Council of Labour Colleges the year after the 1926 United Kingdom general strike, although the Plebs' Magazine continued to appear for many years.

The Plebs Textbook Committee
The Plebs' League established the Plebs Textbook Committee, which was responsible for the collective publishing of several of their books after 1921. These were attributed to "communal production" rather than individual authors.

 Outline of psychology. London: Plebs League, 1921. Plebs Textbooks, No. 1. Drafted by Henry Lyster Jameson.
 Outline of modern imperialism. London: Plebs League, 1922. Plebs Textbooks No. 2. Drafted by Thomas Ashcroft. A Japanese translation by Uchida Sakur appeared in 1929.
 Outline of economics. London: Plebs League, 1923. Plebs Textbooks No. 3. Based on a series of articles by William McLaine, entitled "Economics without Headaches."
 Outline of economic geography. London: Plebs League, 1924. Plebs Textbooks No. 4. Drafted by J. F. Horrabin.
 Outline of European history from the decay of feudalism to the present day. London: Plebs League, 1925. Plebs Textbooks No. 5. Drafted by Maurice Herbert Dobb.
 Outline of finance. London: N.C.L.C. Pub. Society, 1931. Plebs Textbooks No. 6. Drafted by Arthur Woodburn.

References

External links
Archive of 26 issues from February 1915 - January 1917

Further reading 

 Gibson, I., 'Marxism and Ethical Socialism in Britain: the case of Winifred and Frank Horrabin' (BA Thesis, University of Oxford, 2008)
 McIlroy, J., ‘Independent Working Class Education and Trade Union Education and Training’ in Roger Fieldhouse (ed.), A History of Modern British Adult Education (Leicester, 1996), ch.10
 Macintyre, S., A Proletarian Science: Marxism in Britain 1917-33 (Cambridge, 1980)
 Millar, J.P.M.M., The Labour College Movement (London, 1979)
 Phillips, A. and Putnam, T., ‘Education for Emancipation: The Movement for Independent Working-Class Education 1908-1928’, Capital and Class, 10 (1980), pp. 18–42
 Rée, J., Proletarian Philosophers: Problems in Socialist Culture in Britain, 1900-1940 (Oxford, 1984)
 Samuel, R., “British Marxist Historians, 1880-1980: Part One”, NLR, 120 (1980), pp. 21–96
 Samuel, R., The Lost World of British Communism (London, 2006)
 Simon, B., `The Struggle for Hegemony, 1920-1926’ in idem (ed.), The Search for Enlightenment: The Working Class and Adult Education in the Twentieth Century, (London, 1990), pp. 15–70

Organizations established in 1909
1927 disestablishments in the United Kingdom
Marxist organizations
Socialist education
Political organisations based in the United Kingdom
1909 establishments in the United Kingdom